Following is an incomplete list of past and present Members of Parliament (MPs) of the United Kingdom whose surnames begin with R.  The dates in parentheses are the periods for which they were MPs.

Dominic Raab
Giles Radice, Baron Radice
William Rae
Keith Raffan
Henry Cecil Raikes
Bill Rammell
Archibald Maule Ramsay
John Randall
Tom Randall
Syd Rapson
Eleanor Rathbone
Angela Rayner
Nick Raynsford
Martin Redmond
John Redwood
Andy Reed
Jamie Reed
Stanley Reed
Steve Reed
Christina Rees
Merlyn Rees
Peter Rees
Jacob Rees-Mogg
David Rees-Williams, 1st Baron Ogmore
Ellie Reeves
Joseph Reeves
Rachel Reeves
Alan Reid
George Reid
John Reid
John Reith, 1st Baron Reith
David Rendel
Willie Rennie
David Renton, Baron Renton
Timothy Renton
Jonathan Reynolds
Bell Ribeiro-Addy
Ivor Richard, Baron Richard
Jo Richardson
Nicholas Ridley, Baron Ridley of Liddesdale
Malcolm Rifkind
Linda Riordan
Geoffrey Rippon
Charles Ritchie, 1st Baron Ritchie of Dundee
Andrew Robathan
Alfred Robens, Lord Robens of Woldingham
Angus Robertson
George Robertson
Hugh Robertson
John Robertson
John Robertson
Laurence Robertson
Geoffrey Robinson
George Robinson, 1st Marquess of Ripon
Iris Robinson
Peter Robinson
Barbara Roche
Maurice Roche, 4th Baron Fermoy
James Roche, 3rd Baron Fermoy
William Rodgers, Baron Rodgers of Quarry Bank
John Rodgers
Marion Roe
John Arthur Roebuck
Allan Rogers
George Rogers
Dan Rogerson
Jeff Rooker
Terry Rooney
John Bonfoy Rooper
John Roper
Paul Rose
Andrew Rosindell
Ernie Ross
Stephen Ross, Baron Ross of Newport
William Ross
William Ross, Baron Ross of Marnock
Baron Ferdinand de Rothschild
Lionel de Rothschild
Andrew Rowe
Paul Rowen
Ted Rowlands
William Bowen Rowlands
Frank Roy
Chris Ruane
Joan Ruddock
David Ruffley
Walter Runciman, 1st Viscount Runciman of Doxford
Bob Russell
Christine Russell
Francis Russell, 2nd Earl of Bedford
Joan Ryan
Richard Ryder, Baron Ryder of Wensum
Dudley Ryder, 1st Earl of Harrowby
Robert Ryder

 R